Illini Bluffs High School, or IBHS, is a public four-year high school located at 212 North Saylor Street in Glasford, Illinois, a village in Peoria County, Illinois, in the Midwestern United States. IBHS serves the communities of Glasford, Kingston Mines, and Mapleton. The campus is located 15 miles southwest of Peoria, Illinois, and serves a mixed village and rural residential community.

Academics 

Potential reference/citation:

Athletics 
Illini Bluffs High School competes in the tomahawk conference. 

and is a member school in the Illinois High School Association. Their mascot is the Tigers, with school colors of orange and black. The school has no state championships on record in team athletics and activities however the school has had many state championships in individual sports and activities.

History 

Illini Bluffs High School was formed out of the consolidation of Glasford, Kingston Mines, and Mapleton schools at some point in the 1900s. Surrounding communities may have also possessed high schools at some time which were consolidated into the current IBHS. Potential reference/citation:

References

External links 
 Illini Bluffs High School
 Illini Bluffs Community Unit School District 327

Public high schools in Illinois
Schools in Peoria County, Illinois